Kim Hye-song may refer to:

 Kim Hye-song (boxer) (born 1984), North Korean female boxer
 Kim Hye-song (gymnast) (born 1997), North Korean female acrobatic gymnast
 Kim Hye-song (runner) (born 1993), North Korean female long-distance runner
 Kim Hye-song (table tennis), North Korean female table tennis player
 Kim Hye-seong (born 1988), South Korean actor
 Kim Hye-seong (baseball)